The Premios 40 Principales for Best Ecuadorian Act was an honor presented annually at Los Premios 40 Principales España between 2008 and 2011, and later reemerging in 2014 as part of Los Premios 40 Principales América.

References

2011 music awards